Marston Donald Edward Conder  (born 9 September 1955) is a New Zealand mathematician, a Distinguished Professor of Mathematics at Auckland University, and the former co-director of the New Zealand Institute of Mathematics and its Applications. His main research interests are in combinatorial group theory, graph theory, and their connections with each other.

Education and career
Conder was born in Hamilton, New Zealand, and studied at Matamata College. He earned a master's degree in social science from Waikato University in 1977, and a doctorate from Oxford University in 1980 under the supervision of Graham Higman. He served as president of the New Zealand Mathematical Society from 1993 to 1995, and as president of the Academy of the Royal Society of New Zealand from 2006 to 2008. In 2011 he was selected as the inaugural Maclaurin Lecturer, as part of a reciprocal exchange between the New Zealand Mathematical Society and the American Mathematical Society.

Recognition
Conder is a fellow of the New Zealand Mathematical Society and of the Royal Society Te Apārangi, and in 2012 became a fellow of the American Mathematical Society. He was named as a Distinguished Alumnus of Waikato University for 2013.

In March 2021 it was announced that Conder has been awarded the 2020 Euler Medal by the Institute of Combinatorics and its Applications for his "many distinguished contributions to combinatorics over the last 40 years."

In 2014 the Royal Society Te Apārangi awarded Conder the Hector Medal, and in 2018 the Jones Medal, named after Vaughan Jones, "for his internationally renowned research on symmetry and chirality in discrete structures, and his exemplary leadership and service in the New Zealand mathematical sciences community".
In the  2020 Birthday Honours, he was appointed an Officer of the New Zealand Order of Merit (ONZM) for services to mathematics.

References

1955 births
Living people
Group theorists
Graph theorists
Fellows of the American Mathematical Society
University of Waikato alumni
Alumni of the University of Oxford
Academic staff of the University of Auckland
20th-century New Zealand mathematicians
21st-century New Zealand mathematicians
Officers of the New Zealand Order of Merit
Fellows of the Royal Society of New Zealand